The 1951 Albanian Cup was the fifth season of Albania's annual football cup competition. It began in Spring 1951 with the First Round and ended in May 1951 with the Final match. Dinamo Tirana were the defending champions, having won their first Albanian Cup the previous season. The cup was won by Dinamo Tirana.

The rounds were played in a one-legged format. If the number of goals was equal, the match was decided by extra time and a penalty shootout, if necessary.

First round
Games were played on March, 1951*

 Results unknown.

Second round
Games were played on March, 1951.

|}

Quarter-finals
In this round entered the 8 winners from the previous round.

|}

Semi-finals
In this round entered the four winners from the previous round.

|}

Final

References

 Calcio Mondiale Web

External links
 Official website 
 

Cup
Albania
1951